Jukka Tapani Gustafsson (born 2 January 1947) is a Finnish politician. A Social Democrat, he has represented the electoral district of Pirkanmaa in the Parliament of Finland since 1987.

Life 

Gustafsson was born in Turku. He graduated as Master of Social Science in 1976. He served as principal of the Murikka Institute for ten years before being elected to the Parliament in 1987.

In the Parliament, Gustafsson chaired the Employment and Equality Committee from 2003 to 2007. Outside of politics, he served as vice president of the Football Association of Finland from 1991 to 2006. In June 2011, he was appointed Minister of Education to Jyrki Katainen's cabinet. He had to resign from the government in May 2013 when the Social Democratic Party replaced him with Krista Kiuru.

Gustafsson is currently a member of the Grand Committee and the Education and Culture Committee of the Parliament. In addition, he has been a member of the City Council of Tampere since 1976.

References

External links 

 
 Jukka Gustafsson on the website of the Parliament

1947 births
Living people
People from Turku
Social Democratic Party of Finland politicians
Ministers of Education of Finland
Members of the Parliament of Finland (1987–91)
Members of the Parliament of Finland (1991–95)
Members of the Parliament of Finland (1995–99)
Members of the Parliament of Finland (1999–2003)
Members of the Parliament of Finland (2003–07)
Members of the Parliament of Finland (2007–11)
Members of the Parliament of Finland (2011–15)
Members of the Parliament of Finland (2015–19)
Members of the Parliament of Finland (2019–23)